William Augustine O'Grady (24 August 1924 – 20 April 1985), also known as Bill O'Grady, was an Irish footballer who played as a midfielder and made one appearance for the FAI-organised Ireland national team at the 1948 Summer Olympics.

Career
O'Grady made his sole appearance for the national team of the IFA on 26 July 1948 in the 1948 Summer Olympics against the Netherlands The match, which took place at Fratton Park in Portsmouth, finished as a 1–3 loss for Ireland.

Career statistics

International

References

External links
 

1924 births
1985 deaths
Republic of Ireland association footballers
Olympic footballers of Ireland
Footballers at the 1948 Summer Olympics
Association football midfielders
Limerick F.C. players
League of Ireland players